Robin Copping (1934 - 2022) was an Australian cinematographer and producer. He was part of the revival of the Australian film industry in the 1960s and '70, forming notable partnerships with David Bilcock and Tim Burstall and helping form Hexagon Productions.

References

External links

Australian cinematographers
1934 births
Living people